Fratta Todina is a comune in the Province of Perugia in the Italian region Umbria, located about 30 km south of Perugia.  

Fratta Todina borders the following municipalities: Collazzone, Marsciano, Monte Castello di Vibio, San Venanzo, Todi.

Among the churches in town is the San Sabino. Outside of the town, in the neighborhood of Santa Maria della Spineta, is the convent of the same name, and the attached church of Santa Maria Assunta.

References

External links
 Official website

Cities and towns in Umbria